This is a complete List of National Historic Landmarks in Minnesota. The United States National Historic Landmark program is operated under the auspices of the National Park Service, and recognizes structures, districts, objects, and similar resources according to a list of criteria of national significance. The state of Minnesota is home to 25 of these landmarks, illustrating the state's Native American, industrial, logging, mining, military, and political heritage, as well as its contributions to the broader themes of developing the frontier for the European pioneers.

The article also lists other historical landmarks of national importance that are administered by the National Park Service.

Current NHLs

The table below lists all 25 of these sites, along with added detail and description.

|}

Historic areas in the United States National Park System
National Historic Sites, National Historic Parks, National Memorials, and certain other areas listed in the National Park system are historic landmarks of national importance that are highly protected already, often before the inauguration of the NHL program in 1960, and are often not also named NHLs per se. Two additional Minnesota sites have national historical importance and have been designated as National Monuments by the National Park System.

See also
List of U.S. National Historic Landmarks by state
National Register of Historic Places listings in Minnesota
List of Minnesota state parks
Historic preservation
National Register of Historic Places
History of Minnesota

References

External links

National Historic Landmark Program at the National Park Service
Lists of National Historic Landmarks

Minnesota
 
National Historic Landmarks